The Bohlen–Pierce scale (BP scale) is a musical tuning and scale, first described in the 1970s, that offers an alternative to the octave-repeating scales typical in Western and other musics, specifically the equal-tempered diatonic scale.

The interval 3:1 (often called by a new name, tritave) serves as the fundamental harmonic ratio, replacing the diatonic scale's 2:1 (the octave) with a perfect twelfth (an octave higher than a perfect fifth). For any pitch that is part of the BP scale, all pitches one or more tritaves higher or lower are part of the system as well, and are considered equivalent.

The BP scale divides the tritave into 13 steps, either equal tempered (the most popular form), or in a justly tuned version. Compared with octave-repeating scales, the BP scale's intervals are more consonant with certain types of acoustic spectra.

The scale was independently described by Heinz Bohlen, Kees van Prooijen and John R. Pierce. Pierce, who, with Max Mathews and others, published his discovery in 1984, renamed the Pierce 3579b scale and its chromatic variant the Bohlen–Pierce scale after learning of Bohlen's earlier publication. Bohlen had proposed the same scale based on consideration of the influence of combination tones on the Gestalt impression of intervals and chords.

The intervals between BP scale pitch classes are based on odd integer frequency ratios, in contrast with the intervals in diatonic scales, which employ both odd and even ratios found in the harmonic series. Specifically, the BP scale steps are based on ratios of integers whose factors are 3, 5, and 7. Thus the scale contains consonant harmonies based on the odd harmonic overtones 3:5:7:9. The chord formed by the ratio 3:5:7 serves much the same role as the 4:5:6 chord (a major triad ) does in diatonic scales (3:5:7 = 1:: and 4:5:6 = 2::3 = 1::).

Chords and modulation
3:5:7's intonation sensitivity pattern is similar to 4:5:6's (the just major chord), more similar than that of the minor chord. This similarity suggests that our ears will also perceive 3:5:7 as harmonic.

The 3:5:7 chord may thus be considered the major triad of the BP scale. It is approximated by an interval of 6 equal-tempered BP semitones on bottom and an interval of 4 equal-tempered semitones on top (semitones: 0,6,10). A minor triad is correspondingly 6 semitones on top and 4 semitones on bottom (0,4,10). 5:7:9 is the first inversion of the major triad (0,4,7).

A study of chromatic triads formed from arbitrary combinations of the 13 tones of the chromatic scale among twelve musicians and twelve untrained listeners found 0,1,2 (semitones) to be the most dissonant chord, but 0,11,13 was considered the most consonant by the trained subjects (because it sounds like an octave-dropped major triad) and 0,7,10 was judged most consonant by the untrained subjects.

Every tone of the Pierce 3579b scale is in a major and minor triad except for tone II of the scale. There are thirteen possible keys. Modulation is possible through changing a single note. Moving note II up one semitone causes the tonic to rise to what was note III (semitone: 3), which therefore may be considered the dominant. VIII (semitone: 10) may be considered the subdominant.

Timbre and the tritave
3:1 serves as the fundamental harmonic ratio, replacing the diatonic scale's 2:1 (the octave). This interval is a perfect twelfth in diatonic nomenclature (perfect fifth when reduced by an octave), but as this terminology is based on step sizes and functions not used in the BP scale, it is often called by a new name, tritave, in BP contexts, referring to its role as a pseudooctave, and using the prefix "tri-" (three) to distinguish it from the octave. In conventional scales, if a given pitch is part of the system, then all pitches one or more octaves higher or lower also are part of the system and, furthermore, are considered equivalent. In the BP scale, if a given pitch is present, then none of the pitches one or more octaves higher or lower are present, but all pitches one or more tritaves higher or lower are part of the system and are considered equivalent.

The BP scale's use of odd integer ratios is appropriate for timbres containing only odd harmonics. Because the clarinet's spectrum (in the chalumeau register) consists of primarily the odd harmonics, and the instrument overblows at the twelfth (or tritave) rather than the octave as most other woodwind instruments do, there is a natural affinity between it and the Bohlen–Pierce scale. In early 2006, clarinet maker Stephen Fox began offering Bohlen–Pierce soprano clarinets for sale. He produced the first BP tenor clarinet (six steps below the soprano) in 2010 and the first epsilon clarinet (four steps above the soprano) in 2011. A contra clarinet (one tritave lower than the soprano) is now (2020) played by Nora Mueller, Luebeck, Germany.

Just tuning
A diatonic Bohlen–Pierce scale may be constructed with the following just ratios (chart shows the "Lambda" (λ) scale):

A just BP scale may be constructed from four overlapping 3:5:7 chords, for example, V, II, VI, and IV, though different chords may be chosen to produce a similar scale:
 (5:3)(7:5)
 V  IX  III
         |
        III VII I
                |
             VI I IV
                  |
                  IV VIII II

Bohlen–Pierce temperament

Bohlen originally expressed the BP scale in both just intonation and equal temperament. The tempered form, which divides the tritave into thirteen equal steps, has become the most popular form. Each step is  = 3 = 1.08818… above the next, or 1200 log2 (3) = 146.3… cents per step. The octave is divided into a fractional number of steps. Twelve equally tempered steps per octave are used in 12-tet. The Bohlen–Pierce scale could be described as 8.202087-tet, because a full octave (1200 cents), divided by 146.3… cents per step, gives 8.202087 steps per octave.

Dividing the tritave into 13 equal steps tempers out, or reduces to a unison, both of the intervals 245:243 (about 14 cents, sometimes called the minor Bohlen–Pierce diesis) and 3125:3087 (about 21 cents, sometimes called the major Bohlen–Pierce diesis) in the same way that dividing the octave into 12 equal steps reduces both 81:80 (syntonic comma) and 128:125 (5-limit limma) to a unison. A 7-limit linear temperament tempers out both of these intervals; the resulting Bohlen–Pierce temperament no longer has anything to do with tritave equivalences or non-octave scales, beyond the fact that it is well adapted to using them. A tuning of 41 equal steps to the octave ( = 29.27 cents per step) would be quite logical for this temperament. In such a tuning, a tempered perfect twelfth (1902.4 cents, about a half cent larger than a just twelfth) is divided into 65 equal steps, resulting in a seeming paradox: Taking every fifth degree of this octave-based scale yields an excellent approximation to the non-octave-based equally tempered BP scale. Furthermore, an interval of five such steps generates (octave-based) MOSes (moments of symmetry) with 8, 9, or 17 notes, and the 8-note scale (comprising degrees 0, 5, 10, 15, 20, 25, 30, and 35 of the 41-equal scale) could be considered the octave-equivalent version of the Bohlen–Pierce scale.

Intervals and scale diagrams
The following are the thirteen notes in the scale (cents rounded to nearest whole number):

Justly tuned

Equal-tempered

Music and composition

What does music using a Bohlen–Pierce scale sound like, aesthetically? Dave Benson suggests it helps to use only sounds with only odd harmonics, including clarinets or synthesized tones, but argues that because "some of the intervals sound a bit like intervals in [the more familiar] twelve-tone scale, but badly out of tune", the average listener will continually feel "that something isn't quite right", due to social conditioning.

Mathews and Pierce conclude that clear and memorable melodies may be composed in the BP scale, that "counterpoint sounds all right", and that "chordal passages sound like harmony", presumably meaning progression, "but without any great tension or sense of resolution". In their 1989 study of consonance judgment, both intervals of the five chords rated most consonant by trained musicians are approximately diatonic intervals, suggesting that their training influenced their selection and that similar experience with the BP scale would similarly influence their choices.

Compositions using the Bohlen–Pierce scale include "Purity", the first movement of Curtis Roads' Clang-Tint. Other computer composers to use the BP scale include Jon Appleton, Richard Boulanger (Solemn Song for Evening (1990)), Georg Hajdu, Juan Reyes' ppP (1999-2000), Ami Radunskaya's "A Wild and Reckless Place" (1990), Charles Carpenter (Frog à la Pêche (1994) & Splat), and Elaine Walker (Stick Men (1991), Love Song, and Greater Good (2011)).

David Lieberman, an associate professor of architecture at the University of Toronto, directed the development of a "Stredici", a string instrument tuned to the Bohlen–Pierce scale. The five-meter long instrument  was used in concerts in Boston in 2012.

Symposium
A first Bohlen–Pierce symposium took place in Boston on March 7 to 9, 2010, produced by composer Georg Hajdu (Hochschule für Musik und Theater Hamburg) and the Boston Microtonal Society. Co-organizers were the Boston Goethe Institute, the Berklee College of Music, the Northeastern University and the New England Conservatory of Music. The symposium participants, which included Heinz Bohlen, Max Mathews, Clarence Barlow, Curtis Roads, David Wessel, Psyche Loui, Richard Boulanger, Georg Hajdu, Paul Erlich, Ron Sword, Julia Werntz, Larry Polansky, Manfred Stahnke, Stephen Fox, Elaine Walker, Todd Harrop, Gayle Young, Johannes Kretz, Arturo Grolimund, Kevin Foster, presented 20 papers on history and properties of the Bohlen–Pierce scale, performed more than 40 compositions in the novel system and introduced several new musical instruments.
Performers included German musicians Nora-Louise Müller and Ákos Hoffman on Bohlen–Pierce clarinets and Arturo Grolimund on Bohlen–Pierce pan flute as well as Canadian ensemble tranSpectra, and US American xenharmonic band ZIA, led by Elaine Walker.

Other unusual tunings or scales
Other non-octave tunings investigated by Bohlen include twelve steps in the tritave, named A12 by Enrique Moreno  and based on the 4:7:10 chord , seven steps in the octave (7-tet) or similar 11 steps in the tritave, and eight steps in the octave, based on 5:7:9  and of which only the just version would be used.    Additionally, the pentave can be divided into eight steps which approximates chords of the form 5:9:13:17:21:25. The Bohlen 833 cents scale is based on the Fibonacci sequence, although it was created from combination tones, and contains a complex network of harmonic relations due to the inclusion of coinciding harmonics of stacked 833 cent intervals. For example, "step 10 turns out to be identical with the octave (1200 cents) to the base tone, at the same time featuring the Golden Ratio to step 3".

Alternate scales may be specified by indicating the size of equal tempered steps, for example Wendy Carlos' 78-cent alpha scale and 63.8-cent beta scale, and Gary Morrison's 88-cent scale (13.64 steps per octave or 14 per 1232-cent stretched octave). This gives the alpha scale 15.39 steps per octave and the beta scale 18.75 steps per octave.

Expansions

39-tone equal division of the tritave
Paul Erlich proposed dividing each step of the Bohlen–Pierce into thirds so that the tritave is divided into 39 equal steps instead of 13 equal steps. The scale, which can be viewed as three evenly staggered Bohlen-Pierce scales, gives additional odd harmonics. The 13-step scale hits the odd harmonics 3:1; 5:3, 7:3; 7:5, 9:5; 9:7, and 15:7; while the 39-step scale includes all of those and many more (11:5, 13:5; 11:7, 13:7; 11:9, 13:9; 13:11, 15:11, 21:11, 25:11, 27:11; 15:13, 21:13, 25:13, 27:13, 33:13, and 35:13), while still missing almost all of the even harmonics (including 2:1; 3:2, 5:2; 4:3, 8:3; 6:5, 8:5; 9:8, 11:8, 13:8, and 15:8). The size of this scale is about 25 equal steps to a ratio slightly larger than an octave, so each of the 39 equal steps is slightly smaller than half of one of the 12 equal steps of the standard scale.

65-tone equal division of the tritave
Dividing each step of the Bohlen-Pierce scale into fifths (so that the tritave is divided into 65 steps) results in a very accurate octave (41 steps) and perfect fifth (24 steps), as well as approximations for other just intervals. The scale is practically identical to 41-tone equal division of the octave except that each step is slightly smaller (less than a hundredth of a cent per step).

See also
Double reed
Square wave
Other non-octave repeating scales:
Delta scale
Gamma scale

References

External links
 "The Bohlen–Pierce Scale" Research, ZiaSpace.com.
 "Stephen Fox Clarinets", Bohlen-Pierce clarinets and other instruments, SFoxClarinets.com.
 "The Bohlen–Pierce Site: Web place of an alternative harmonic scale", Huygens-Fokker.org.
 "Kees van Prooijen: 13 tones in the 3rd harmonic", Kees.cc.
 Song in Bohlen Pierce Scale: "17tppp4 Walker Love Song", Xenharmonic.Wikispaces.com.
 "The Bohlen–Pierce Symposium", Bohlen-Pierce-Conference.org.
 "Bohlen–Pierce Scale Symposium, Boston 2010" [playlist], YouTube.com.

Just tuning and intervals
Non–octave-repeating scales
Musical temperaments